Schengen is a small wine-making village and commune in far south-eastern Luxembourg, on the western bank of the river Moselle. The commune border includes the tripoint where the borders of Germany, France, and Luxembourg meet.

The largest settlement within the commune of Schengen is Remerschen after which the commune used to be named. The name of the commune was changed in 2006 to take advantage of the Schengen's name recognition after the signing of the Schengen Agreement there in 1985.

Schengen Castle dates from 1390 but was almost completely rebuilt in the 19th century.

Populated places
The commune consists of the following villages:

 Schengen Section:
 Remerschen
 Schengen
 Wintrange

 Burmerange Section:
 Burmerange
 Elvange
 Emerange
 Froumillen
 Weidemillen

 Wellenstein Section:
 Bech-Kleinmacher
 Schwebsange
 Wellenstein

Population

European Museum
The European Museum was opened on 13 June 2010, 25 years after the signing of the Schengen Treaty, in the Centre européen building.

The signing of the Agreement is documented with historic photos and video and sound footage as well as statements by those involved at the time.

Twin towns — sister cities

Schengen is twinned with:
 Ischgl, Austria

References

External links

 
 Schengen-Tourist

 
Communes in Remich (canton)
Villages in Luxembourg